Kraner is a surname. Notable people with the surname include:

 Doug Kraner (died 2016), American production designer
 Friedrich Kraner (1812–1863), German schoolteacher and classical philologist
 (1918–2012), Austrian actress

See also
 Kramer (surname)